Parmelee House may refer to:

Parmelee House (Killingworth, Connecticut), listed on the National Register of Historic Places in Middlesex County, Connecticut, United States
Parmelee House (Valley City, Ohio), listed on the National Register of Historic Places in Medina County, Ohio